Little Maghreb is a neighbourhood in the borough of Villeray–Saint-Michel–Parc-Extension in Montreal. The neighbourhood is centered on fifteen blocks of Jean Talon Street stretching from Saint-Michel Boulevard in the West to Pie-IX Boulevard in the East. Maghrebi merchants in the area, mainly from Algeria, Morocco and Tunisia, have joined together to create a Little Maghreb identity for the neighbourhood, in the same way as Chinatown had become a symbol for Chinese Montrealers, and Little Italy had become the focal point of the city's Italian community. 

Originally a part of the Saint-Michel neighbourhood, the late 1990s marked the beginning of the neighbourhood's Maghrebi flavour. This was a product of the opening of the Dar Al-Arkam Mosque on the corner of Jean-Talon and 17th Avenue and the arrival of thousands of immigrants from Algeria, Morocco, Libya, and Tunisia.

Little Maghreb is served by the Saint-Michel Metro station on the Blue Line, with the upcoming eastbound extension of the Blue Line also continuing under the district.

References

Arab diaspora in North America
African diaspora in North America
Algerian diaspora
Arab-Canadian culture
Arab Canadian
Berber Canadian
Ethnic enclaves in Quebec
Moroccan Canadian
Neighbourhoods in Montreal
North African diaspora in Canada
Tunisian diaspora
Villeray–Saint-Michel–Parc-Extension